Ballet continued to be an important part of the Edinburgh International Festival during the second decade of the festival. As at the beginning, most performances took place at the Empire Theatre, later to be refurbished to become the Edinburgh Festival Theatre.

In addition to London's The Royal Ballet who came in 1960, there were a total of 16 visiting companies from abroad who came to the city, offering varied programmes for festival goers.

List

See also
Edinburgh International Festival
Ballet at the Edinburgh International Festival: history and repertoire, 1947–1956
Ballet at the Edinburgh International Festival: history and repertoire, 1967–1976
Opera at the Edinburgh International Festival: history and repertoire, 1947–1956
Opera at the Edinburgh International Festival: history and repertoire, 1957–1966
Opera at the Edinburgh International Festival: history and repertoire, 1967–1976
Drama at the Edinburgh International Festival: history and repertoire, 1947–1956
Drama at the Edinburgh International Festival: history and repertoire, 1957–1966
Musicians at the Edinburgh International Festival, 1947 to 1956
Musicians at the Edinburgh International Festival, 1957–1966
Visual Arts at the Edinburgh International Festival, 1947–1976
World premieres at the Edinburgh International Festival

References

Edinburgh Festival
Annual events in Edinburgh
Ballet-related lists